Juncus filiformis, called the thread rush, is a species of flowering plant in the genus Juncus, with a circumboreal distribution. It has been introduced to South Georgia Island. It is typically found in wetlands, on the borders of lakes and streams.

References

filiformis
Taxa named by Carl Linnaeus
Plants described in 1753